The 2019 Women's International Tournament of Spain was the 23nd edition of the Women's International Tournament Of Spain, held in Palencia, Spain between 21–23 March as a friendly handball tournament organised by the Royal Spanish Handball Federation.

Results

Round robin
All times are local (UTC+1).

Final standing

References

External links
RFEBM Official Website

International Tournament of Spain
2018–19 in Spanish handball
Handball competitions in Spain
Women's International Tournament of Spain